Crumbs is a 2015 Ethiopian post-apocalyptic science fiction romance film. It is the first feature film from Spanish-born director Miguel Llansó.

Filmed around Dallol, Ethiopia on a budget of $225,000, Crumbs "takes an exotic and sometimes surreal approach to what's essentially a simple, touching love story". Premiered at the Rotterdam International Film Festival, Crumbs won a Nightfall Jury Mention at the 2015 Los Angeles Film Festival and the Award for Best First Feature Film at the 2015 Fantasia International Film Festival.

Synopsis

In a dazzlingly imaginative vision of a postapocalyptic Ethiopia, a hapless scavenger finds himself launched on a surreal adventure involving a mysterious UFO, witches, Santa Claus, Nazi knights, and more. Conjuring a loop-the-loop universe from the detritus of late-twentieth-century pop culture (from Michael Jordan to Ninja Turtles), this psychedelic fantasia surprises and charms as it spins off its own giddy axis.

References

External links
 

2015 films
Films shot in Ethiopia
Films set in Ethiopia
Post-apocalyptic films